The Omaru River is a river of the Northland Region of New Zealand's North Island. It flows generally north from several streams with origins northwest of Paparoa, reaching the Manganui River 20 kilometres northeast of Ruawai.

The New Zealand Ministry for Culture and Heritage gives a translation of "place of shelter" for Ōmaru.

See also
List of rivers of New Zealand

References

Rivers of the Northland Region
Rivers of New Zealand
Kaipara Harbour catchment